Jabala ibn Ali al-Shaybani (Arabic: جَبَلَة بن عَلی الشَیبانی) was martyred at the Battle of Karbala.

Biography 
Jabala ibn Ali was from Banu Shayban tribe, a branch of Bakr ibn Wa'il. he was in Ali ibn Abi talib's army in the Battle of Siffin. He also accompanied Muslim ibn Aqil in his uprising in Kufa. Before Muslim was martyred, he escaped capture by Ubayd Allah ibn Ziyad.

In the Battle of Karbala 
When Husayn ibn Ali reached Karbala, Jabala joined his army. He was martyred in the first attack on the Day of Ashura.

Ziyarat al-Shuhada mentions him by name: "Peace be upon Jabala ibn 'Ali al-Shaybani"

References 

People killed at the Battle of Karbala
Husayn ibn Ali
Hussainiya
600s births
680 deaths

Year of birth uncertain